The MT350E is a motorcycle manufactured by Harley-Davidson. A development of the Armstrong MT500 with a smaller capacity engine, electric start and disc brakes.

Users

External links
  MT350 and MT500 resources at milweb

MT350E
Military motorcycles
Motorcycles introduced in 1993